Gunungkidul Regency is a regency in the southeast part of the province of Yogyakarta Special Region, Indonesia. It is located on the island of Java. The regency (the name of which means South Mountains in Javanese) is bordered by the Sleman Regency to the north west, Bantul Regency to the west, the Indian Ocean to the south, Wonogiri Regency to the east and Klaten Regency to the north. It covers an area of 1,485.36 km2 and had a population of 675,382 at the 2010 Census and 747,161 at the 2020 Census.

The traditional snacks and meals from Gunungkidul include "Gathot" and "Thiwul". They are made from Fermentation Cassava and Dry Cassava.

The southern coast of Gunungkidul has several beaches: Baron, Kukup, Krakal, Drini, Sepanjang, Sundak, Siung, Wediombo, Jungwok, Greweng, Sedahan and Sadeng. Some of these beaches provide fresh fish and other sea product supplied by local fisherman. The most notable is Baron Beach. There is a park next to the beach surrounded by seafood restaurants and hostels. There is a fresh fish market on the east side of the beach. On the west side, a river flows out from an almost sea-level cave on the side of the western ridge. The beach itself is khaki-colored and sprawled with traditional fishermen's boats. Beside the main beach, there is a kilometer of white sand beach lying beyond its eastern ridge. It can be reached by a small hike.

There are also tourist sites to visit near the beach area of Parangtritis which is located on the border of the Gunungkidul and Bantul districts. There are some temples, springs, and underground rivers in the village of Girijati near Parangtritis.

The Gunungkidul area in earlier times was heavily forested. However, most of the teak forests have now been removed and many reforestation projects occur on the western edge of the Regency. The Regency has been subject to extensive drought and famine within the last hundred years. Water shortages and poverty remain serious problems in the region.

Administrative districts

Gunungkidul Regency is divided into eighteen administrative districts (Indonesian: kapanewon), tabulated below with their areas and their populations at the 2010 Census and the 2020 Census.

General condition

Geography
Gunungkidul Regency is in a karst region.  This leads to difficult geography for farmers and contributes to considerable poverty in the area because of water shortages.  Much of the Regency is included in the Mount Sewu (literally "thousand mountains") collection of limestone hills which stretches across parts of southern Java from parts of Kebumen Regency in the west near the border with West Java across to close to the city of Malang in East Java.  The Menoreh Hills in the area south of Yogyakarta in Kulonprogo Regency, for example, are part of this series of limestone hills.

Caves

The limestone hills are reported to contain hundreds of caves.  These are classified locally as vertical luweng (known as "luweng" in Javanese) and horizontal caves.  Jomblang Cave (Luweng Jomblang) and Kalisuci Cave (Luweng Kalisuci) located in the Semanu District in Gunungkidul Regency, as well as other caves in the area, are well-known to local caving (speleological) groups. Some of the caves are quite long; Cerme cave, for example, has an entrance in Bantul Regency and stretches for quite a distance eastward into Panggang subdistrict in Gunungkidul Regency.

Prehistory

From archaeological findings, the area of Gunungkidul Regency is thought to have been inhabited by humans (Homo Sapiens) from 700,000 years ago. Many find the instructions of human existence found in caves and niches in karst of Gunungkidul, especially in Ponjong District. The human propensity Gunung occupy the time it caused most of the lowland in Yogyakarta is still flooded. The arrival of the first humans in Gunungkidul occurred at the end of the Pleistocene period . At that time, the human race Australoid migrated from the Pegunungan Sewu in Pacitan, East Java passing Wonogiri karst valleys, Central Java until it reaches the southern coast of Gunungkidul through ancient, Bengawan Solo.

Borderline
 North ; Klaten, Sukoharjo, Sleman
 West ;  Imogiri, Pundong, Dlingo, Piyungan
 South ; Indian Ocean
 East ; Wonogiri

Culture

Gunungkidul Regency is located in the limestone uplands of Java,  and a delicacy called walang goreng (fried grasshoppers).

Topography

North Zone
The northern zone is called Agung Batur region, with an altitude of 200–700 m above sea level. The situation is hilly, there are sources of groundwater depth of 6m - 12m from the ground. Latosol soil types dominated by volcanic and sedimentary parent hurricane stones. This area includes the districts of Patuk, Gedangsari, Nglipar, Ngawen, Semin, and the northern part of the district of Ponjong.

Central Zone

The Central Zone is called Ledok Wonosari development, with an altitude of 150–200 m above sea level. The soil type is dominated by Mediterranean association with the red and black grumusol limestone. So despite its long dry season, the water particles are still able to survive. There is a river on the land. Groundwater depth ranges between 60–120 m below the ground surface. This area includes the districts of Playen, Wonosari, Karangmojo and Ponjong, and the central and northern parts of Semanu.

South Zone
The Southern Zone is called Pegunungan Sewu development area (Duizon gebergton or Zuider gebergton), with an altitude of 0–300 m above sea level. Constituent bedrock is limestone with characteristic conical hills (Conical limestone) and the karst area. Underground rivers are often found in this region. The southern zone includes the districts of Saptosari, Paliyan, Girisubo, Tanjungsari, Tepus, Rongkop, Purwosari and Panggang, and the southern parts of Ponjong and Semanu.

Climatology
Gunungkidul regency including tropical area, the topography of a region dominated by karst region area. The southern region is dominated by karst region, that are numerous natural caves and underground rivers flowing. Under these conditions cause the condition of the land in the southern area which resulted in less fertile agricultural cultivation in this region is less than optimal.
Gunungkidul climatological conditions generally exhibit the following conditions:
 The average rainfall in 2010 amounted to 1954.43 mm/year with the number of rainy days an average of 103 days/year. Wet months 7 months, while the dry months range from 5 months. Gunungkidul north region has the highest rainfall over central and southern regions. Gunungkidul southern region has the most rain beginning late
 Temperatures daily average of 27.7 °C, minimum temperature of 23.2 °C and a maximum temperature of 35  °C.
 Relative humidity ranging between 80% - 85%, not too influenced by the high places, but more influenced by the seasons.

Heirloom

Tombak Kyai Marga Salurung 
Tombak Kyai Marga Salurung is one of heirloom gift from the King of Yogyakarta, Hamengkubuwono X on Sunday, May 27, 2001, when the Celebration of 170th Anniversary of Gunungkidul Regency. Spear heirloom that has a new dhapur cekel,  warangka kajeng sanakeling symbolize that the district government of Gunungkidul still has a major commitment to achieve lofty ideals are deeply rooted and always siding with the people. The leaders and the people have the attitude or the direction salurung approval, accord, saiyeg - saeka- kapti in the corridors of democracy, which means heavy hands make light work, conscious of their rights, but also respect the rights of others and known for certain obligations.

Tombak Kyai Panjolo Panjul

Songsong (Payung) Kyai Robyong

UNESCO Geopark

Gunungkidul Regency and the nearby Imogiri area (in Bantul Regency) and Pacitan Regency (East Java Province) is being promoted by the Indonesia government to be a UNESCO Geopark, due to their unique and scenic karst landscape. An accessor from UNESCO has visited 4 areas in July 2014.  These include:
 Pindul Cave, in tectonic active area, the cave and the Gunungkidul Karst Region give more variation of karst stone/land, if it is compared with Gunung Sewu area in Pacitan and Wonogiri
 Nglanggeran Primeval Volcano
 Gunung Batur Primeval Volcano
 Bobung Tourism Village
 Siung Beach

As a karst region, Gunungkidul Regency has many caves, some of which have underground rivers. At least two of them (Pindul Cave in the Bejiharjo area and Kalisuci Cave in the Semanu area) are regarded as tourist sites where tubing activities can be carried on.

Nglanggeran primeval volcano in the Patuk area is only 600 meters high but there are excellent views from the peak to the north towards Mount Merapi and to the south across to the coast of Java. Scattered giant granite and andesite rock formations called "watu wayang" (puppet rocks) are found at the Mt Nglanggeran area as well as a nearby man-made lake. It takes around 3 hours to hike from the Pendopo Kali Song entrance point to the peak.

Siung Beach Bay is about 300 meters in length, but swimming is prohibited because of dangerous rocks and severe waves. The cliff surrounding the beach, with over 200 tracks, is suitable for rock climbing.

200 meters east of Siung Beach there is a 10-meter Jogan Tide Fall in Tepus district which is 70 kilometers from Yogyakarta in 2 hours drive. Rainy season is the best time to see the Jogan Tide Fall, because in the dry season, the water level is low.

References

External links